Bellota is also a synonym of the plant genus Ocotea (sweetwoods).

Bellota is a genus of jumping spiders that was first described by George Peckham & Elizabeth Peckham in 1892. It is similar in appearance to the genus Chirothecia, but has a narrower cephalothorax and a shorter eye area.

Species
 it contains nine species, found in South America, Panama, the United States, and Pakistan:
Bellota fascialis Dyal, 1935 – Pakistan
Bellota formicina (Taczanowski, 1878) – Peru
Bellota livida Dyal, 1935 – Pakistan
Bellota micans Peckham & Peckham, 1909 – USA
Bellota modesta (Chickering, 1946) – Panama
Bellota peckhami Galiano, 1978 (type) – Venezuela
Bellota violacea Galiano, 1972 – Brazil
Bellota wheeleri Peckham & Peckham, 1909 – USA
Bellota yacui Galiano, 1972 – Argentina

References

Salticidae genera
Salticidae
Spiders of Asia
Spiders of North America
Spiders of South America